The 1989 Tour of Britain was the third edition of the Kellogg's Tour of Britain cycle race and was held from 29 August to 3 September 1989. The race started in Dundee and finished in London. The race was won by Robert Millar of the Z–Peugeot team.

Route

General classification

References

1989
Tour of Britain
Tour of Britain
August 1989 sports events in the United Kingdom
September 1989 sports events in the United Kingdom